The Clinical Society of London was founded in London in 1868 and merged in 1907 with the Royal Society of Medicine.

The founding of the Clinical Society was mainly due to Drs. Edward Headlam Greenhow and John Burdon Sanderson who convened a meeting to discuss the formation of a society "for the cultivation and promotion of practical medicine and surgery by the collection of cases, especially such as bear upon undetermined questions in pathology and therapeutics". Sir Thomas Watson was appointed first president and some 110 members recruited and the first general meeting held on 10 January 1868. Ordinary meetings were then held twice a month from October to May, at which short papers were submitted and discussed. The specific medical cases discussed were drawn from all branches of medicine. An annual general meeting was held at which officers were elected. Presidents served for two years.

In 1896 the society invited Professor Silvanus Phillips Thompson to demonstrate the new x-ray machine before 400 members.

When in 1907 the society merged with the Royal Society of Medicine it numbered 572 ordinary members and 16 honorary members.

Presidents

Source:Clinical Society

References

Learned societies of the United Kingdom
Professional associations based in the United Kingdom
Clubs and societies in London
Organizations established in 1868